Little People, Big World is an American reality television series that premiered on March 4, 2006, and airs on TLC. The series chronicles the lives of the six-member Roloff family farm near Portland, Oregon. Many of the episodes focus on the parents, Matt and Amy, and one of their children, Zach, who has dwarfism.

On August 26, 2010, TLC announced that the sixth season would be the last for the show. However, the show was never canceled and remains on the air to this day.

After its original final season, TLC aired several specials: "Conquering Mount St. Helens", "Breaking Down the Walls", and "Welcome to the Jungle". On October 5, 2012, TLC announced a spin-off series – Little People Big World: Wedding Farm. It chronicles Matt and Amy as they jump-start their wedding business on the farm. The series premiered on November 13, 2012, and ran for six episodes.

Background
In 2010, Amy Roloff commented on the beginnings of the show: "TLC came to us about five or six years ago, and so we suddenly realized we were given a great opportunity to educate people about dwarfism. When it was offered that we do a show about our lives, my husband and I were like, "Wow, nothing like this has even been on the air." Nothing had depicted dwarfism in an everyday way. Lo and behold, a few episodes turned into six seasons. And here we are."

Premise
The show follows the daily lives of the Roloff family — parents Matt and Amy, and their four children: Zach, Jeremy, Molly, and Jacob. Matt, Amy, and Zach have dwarfism, while Jeremy, Molly, and Jacob are of average height. Zach and Jeremy are fraternal twins; although Jeremy is of average height, his brother Zach is a little person (4'4", or 132 cm).

The family lives on the  Roloff Farms, located north of Hillsboro in Helvetia, Oregon, a suburb of Portland. Although crops of pumpkins are grown and sold by the family, much of the farm has been converted into a series of playground set pieces for the Roloff children. They were designed by Matt, who spent most of his childhood in the hospital. He has tried to make his children's lives the best possible.

Episodes of the show typically showcase one or more members of the Roloff family engaging in everyday activities such as shopping, athletics, and dealing with household finances. The drama of the show arises because many of these activities are made more challenging due to the height of the little people in the family, as Matt and Amy are 4'1" (124 cm) and Zach is 4'4" (132 cm).

Family members

Parents
 Matthew ("Matt") – (born October 7, 1961, in California) ex-husband and father; Matt's career was in computer software sales. As the series began, Matt was no longer employed by the company, but was engaged in establishing the business he co-founded, Direct Access Solutions. The company markets accessibility kits for little people to the hospitality industry. As the first season ended, Matt started another job as a software salesman with Amdocs to provide the family with additional income. Matt's type of dwarfism, diastrophic dysplasia, resulted in numerous childhood surgeries. He walks with the aid of crutches and uses a motorized cart when needed.
 Amy Roloff (née Knight) – (b. September 17, 1962, in Michigan) ex-wife and mother; Amy's type of dwarfism is achondroplasia, and she has experienced very few (if any) complications. Amy is a graduate of Central Michigan University. When not acting, coaching, parenting, or teaching, she is a philanthropist. Her Amy Roloff Charity Foundation makes use of her celebrity by benefiting the needs of kids, at-risk youths, and disability groups. Amy has also given back to the Dwarf Athletic Association of America, helped fund an organization for foster care parents and the kids they have adopted, and supported low-income senior housing and a homeless shelter focusing on keeping family units together. Achondroplasia is an autosomal dominant genetic disorder with 80% of cases identified as a sporadic mutation.

Children
 Zachary Luke
 Jeremy James
 Molly Jo
 Jacob George

Episodes

Ratings and Reception
The first season of Little People, Big World generated adequate ratings for TLC (especially in the 18–49 demographic), leading to the show's renewal for a second season.  Critical reviews of the series have been generally positive, citing the show's positive portrayal of little people.  Conversely, other reviews have claimed that the show has a voyeuristic bend to it (albeit a nonsexual one), but allows the viewer to feel good about watching because it is not outwardly or overtly exploitive.

The September 30, 2014, finale of Little People, Big Worlds eighth season broke series records; 2.3 million total viewers tuned in to watch Jeremy Roloff marry his long-time girlfriend, Audrey Botti.  The finale was the highest-rated episode in six years among women 25–54 and was number one on cable in the 10:00 pm timeslot among women 18–49 and women 18–34. The wedding finale capped the series' highest-rated season, in which it averaged 1.9 million viewers per episode.

Since the show began airing, Roloff Farms has become an extremely popular tourist destination. While the farm and its many attractions have long been available for public viewing during pumpkin season (October), it began receiving far more visitors than can be accommodated. During the 2006 season, more than 30,000 people arrived to buy pumpkins and tour the farm, which only had space for a few hundred vehicles. The farm was shut down temporarily by Washington County deputies on one Saturday in October 2006, due to massive traffic. Area residents have complained about the gridlock caused by the visitors, as well as about the increased media scrutiny the show has brought.

The Roloffs receive a large amount of correspondence. One report said as many as a dozen emails per minute arrive from supporters, however, the family did not confirm it. The increased exposure, however, has led to safety concerns for the family, who now deal with trespassers and fans. They have since installed a security gate on their property.

Controversies
In 2007, Matt Roloff was arrested on DUI charges. While he was found not guilty of the DUI, he was found guilty of refusing to submit to a blood alcohol test.  As a result of his refusal, his driver's license was suspended for three years, because he had previously admitted guilt in a drunken-driving diversion program that he completed in 2003.

In 2020, Jacob Roloff claimed that he was groomed and molested by former producer Chris Cardamone during the production of the series between 2007 and 2010, when Roloff was between the ages of 10 and 13 years old. While Roloff did not divulge details of the abuse, he emphasized that "all fault lies with the predator" and that "no fault lies with any of my family members." TLC responded to the allegations by saying "We are saddened and troubled by this very serious allegation, and TLC will work cooperatively with the authorities. Our main focus remains on supporting the Roloff family during this very difficult time.”

References

Further reading

External links
 
 

2000s American reality television series
2010s American reality television series
2006 American television series debuts
Works about dwarfism
English-language television shows
Television series about children
Television series about families
Television shows filmed in Oregon
Television shows set in Oregon
TLC (TV network) original programming
Washington County, Oregon
Hillsboro, Oregon
Oregon culture
2020s American reality television series
Television shows set on farms